Hesar-e Seyyedlar (also Romanized as Ḩeşār-e Seyyedlar; also known as Ḩeşār) is a village in Qeshlaq Rural District, in the Central District of Ahar County, East Azerbaijan Province, Iran. At the 2006 census, its population was 34, in 10 families.

References 

Populated places in Ahar County